Livia Drusa (c. 120 BC – c. 92 BC) was a Roman matron. She was the daughter of Marcus Livius Drusus, consul in 112 BC, and sister of Marcus Livius Drusus, tribune of the plebs in 91 BC. She was the mother of Cato the Younger, and grandmother of Marcus Junius Brutus, through her oldest daughter Servilia.

Life and family
Livia's father died in 108 BC, and she passed into the care of her brother, the younger Livius Drusus.  About 106, Drusus arranged for her to marry his friend, Quintus Servilius Caepio.  They had three children:

 Servilia, born before 100 BC, married Marcus Junius Brutus, and was the mother of Brutus, the tyrannicide. She was the mistress of Caesar, for which reason Caesar was rumoured to be Brutus' father.
 Servilia Minor, born circa 99 BC, the second wife of Lucius Licinius Lucullus, consul in 74 BC.
 Gnaeus Servilius Caepio, born circa 98 BC, a military tribune during the Third Servile War.

Livia and Caepio must have divorced about 98 BC, for reasons not stated by any ancient historian; but Pliny the Elder reports that Caepio and Drusus had fallen out over the sale of a ring for which each was bidding at auction.  Livia then married Marcus Porcius Cato, a grandson of Cato the Elder.  They had two children:

 Porcia, born circa 96 BC, married Lucius Domitius Ahenobarbus, consul in 54 BC.
 Marcus Porcius Cato Uticensis, or Cato the Younger, born 95 BC, a statesman, orator, and political opponent of Caesar.

Cato and Livia both died in the late 90s BC, and their children were raised in the household of Livia's brother, Marcus Livius Drusus.

Family

In fiction
Livia Drusa appears as a major character in the first two books of Colleen McCullough's Masters of Rome series. In The First Man in Rome, her brother coerces her into marrying Caepio, whom she dislikes. In The Grass Crown, McCullough depicts Livia's relationship with Cato as having begun before her divorce from Caepio and makes Caepio's youngest son (his only son and heir, in this fictional account) the natural son of Cato.

See also
 Livia gens

Notes

References

Bibliography

 Marcus Tullius Cicero, Brutus, Epistulae ad Atticum, Pro Milone.
 Gaius Sallustius Crispus (Sallust), Bellum Catilinae (The Conspiracy of Catiline).
 Titus Livius (Livy), History of Rome.
 Valerius Maximus, Factorum ac Dictorum Memorabilium (Memorable Facts and Sayings).
 Gaius Plinius Secundus (Pliny the Elder), Historia Naturalis (Natural History).
 Plutarchus, Lives of the Noble Greeks and Romans.
 Sextus Aurelius Victor, De Viris Illustribus (On Famous Men).
 Paulus Manutius, Ad Ciceronis de Finibus (Commentary on Cicero's De Finibus Bonorum et Malorum), Venice (1541).
 Wilhelm Drumann, Geschichte Roms in seinem Übergang von der republikanischen zur monarchischen Verfassung, oder: Pompeius, Caesar, Cicero und ihre Zeitgenossen, Königsberg (1834–1844).
 Emilio Gabba, Republican Rome, the Army, and the Allies, Berkley (1976).
 Helena Stegman, "Livia", in Brill's New Pauly.

120s BC births
90s BC deaths
Year of birth uncertain
Year of death uncertain
Livii Drusi
2nd-century BC Roman women
1st-century BC Roman women
1st-century BC Romans
Family of Servilia (mother of Brutus)